Yamato-1 is a ship built in the early 1990s by Mitsubishi Heavy Industries, Ltd. at Wadasaki-cho Hyogo-ku, Kobe. It uses magnetohydrodynamic drives (MHDDs) driven by liquid helium-cooled superconductors and can travel at 15 km/h (8 knots).

Yamato-1 was the first working prototype of her kind. It was completed in Japan in 1991, by the Ship & Ocean Foundation (later known as the Ocean Policy Research Foundation). The ship, which includes two magnetohydrodynamic (MHD) thrusters, which have no moving parts, was first successfully operated in Kobe harbour in June 1992.

An MHDD works by applying a magnetic field to an electrically conducting fluid. The electrically conducting fluid used in the MHD thrusters of Yamato-1 is seawater.

In the 1990s, Mitsubishi built several prototypes of ships propelled by MHDD systems. Despite projected higher speeds, these ships were only able to reach speeds of 15 km/h.

Today Yamato-1 is on display at the Kobe Maritime Museum.

Further reading
 Yohei Sasakawa: Yamato-1 - the world's first superconducting MHD propulsion ship. Ship & Ocean Foundation, Tokyo 1997,

External links

 Magnetohydrodynamic and the Mitsubishi Yamato
 Popular Science November 1992 Superconductivity Goes To Sea
 Popular Mechanics August 1990 100 MPH Jet Ships
 Ship Sails on High-Tech, `Silent' Drive The Washington Post, June 17, 1992;
 Japanese Ship's Magnetic Attraction; Revolutionary Drive Design Lacks Moving Parts The Washington Post, June 22, 1992

Ships built by Mitsubishi Heavy Industries
Experimental ships
Boat types
1991 ships
Museum ships in Japan